Blackdiamondskye was a 2010 North American concert tour headlined by American rock band Alice in Chains featuring special guests Deftones and Mastodon. Blackdiamondskye is a portmanteau of the three band's then-most recent albums: Alice in Chains' Black Gives Way to Blue (2009), Deftones' Diamond Eyes (2010), and Mastodon's Crack the Skye (2009). The tour began on September 16, 2010 in Chicago and concluded on October 16, 2010 in Las Vegas.

History
The tour was officially announced on April 29, 2010, after a series of cryptic videos were posted on YouTube and a countdown was posted on the recently launched blackdiamondskye.com site a week prior to the announcement. Manager David Benveniste from Velvet Hammer Music and Management Group said about the strategy, "Rather than launch with a traditional tour announcement, we wanted to engage the fans first. We gave them a cryptic clip featuring video snippets of each band and they lit up the internet. Now there's an entire online community talking about the tour and speculating about the bands involved. It's thrilling to see them communicate and respond so positively to this exciting tour." More dates were announced on June 14, 2010.

On August 31, 2010, MTV launched a contest asking the fans of Alice in Chains to create a custom trailer for the tour. The winning submissions were chosen by the band and the grand prize winner received a personalized Black Gives Way To Blue gold record, VIP tickets to any date on the tour, a meet-and-greet with the band and an autographed poster.

The tour kicked off on September 16 in Chicago and wrapped up on October 16 in Paradise, Nevada. The tour lasted for 19 shows over the course of one month and featured shows at both outdoor arena and amphitheatres and indoor venues.

Alice in Chains' concert at the KeyArena in Seattle on October 8, 2010 was filmed in 3D for a future release. The concert was helmed by director Tim Cronenweth and director of photography Jeff Cronenweth.

The basic riff for the Alice in Chains' song "Hollow" came to Jerry Cantrell while he was in his dressing room in Las Vegas warming up for the last concert of the tour. He started playing the riff and recorded it to use it later. Producer Nick Raskulinecz and Cantrell's managers were at that show and praised the riff when they heard Cantrell playing it. The song was featured on the band's fifth studio album, The Devil Put Dinosaurs Here, released in May 2013.

Tour dates

Setlist

Alice in Chains Setlist
 "Again"
 "Check My Brain"
 "Dam That River"
 "Lesson Learned"
 "Man in the Box"
 "No Excuses"
 "Rain When I Die"
 "Rooster"
 "Them Bones"
 "We Die Young"
 "Would?"
 "Your Decision"
 "Grind"
 "Acid Bubble"
 "It Ain't Like That"
 "Junkhead"
 "Nutshell"
 "Last of My Kind"
 "Love, Hate, Love"
 "A Looking in View"
 "Angry Chair"
 "Down in a Hole"
 "God Am"
 "Got Me Wrong"
 "Black Gives Way to Blue"
 "Rotten Apple"
 "Sludge Factory"
 "Sickman"
Deftones Setlist
 "Around the Fur"
 "Change (In the House of Flies)"
 "Diamond Eyes"
 "My Own Summer (Shove It)"
 "Rocket Skates"
 "Sextape"
 "You've Seen the Butcher"
 "7 Words"
 "Engine No. 9"
 "Be Quiet and Drive (Far Away)"
 "Passenger"
 "Nosebleed"
 "Birthmark"
 "Prince"
 "Risk"
 "Beauty School"
 "Headup"
Mastodon Setlist
 "Colony of Birchmen"
 "Crystal Skull"
 "Divinations"
 "Megalodon"
 "Naked Burn"
 "Blood and Thunder"
 "The Czar"
 "Oblivion"
 "Capillarian Crest"
 "Aqua Dementia"
 "Circle of Cysquatch"
 "Iron Tusk"
 "March of the Fire Ants"
 "Sleeping Giant"
 "I Am Ahab"
 "Seabeast"

Personnel
Alice in Chains
 Jerry Cantrell – vocals, lead guitar
 William DuVall – vocals, rhythm guitar
 Mike Inez – bass
 Sean Kinney – drums
Deftones
 Chino Moreno – vocals, rhythm guitar
 Stephen Carpenter – lead guitar
 Sergio Vega – bass
 Frank Delgado – keyboards, samplers, turntables
 Abe Cunningham – drums 
Mastodon
 Brent Hinds – vocals, lead guitar
 Bill Kelliher – rhythm guitar
 Troy Sanders – bass
 Brann Dailor – vocals, drums

References

External links
Official Website
Official YouTube Channel
Official Twitter
Blackdiamondskye at Setlist.fm

2010 concert tours
Alice in Chains
Deftones